This paleomammalogy list records new  fossil mammal taxa that were described during the year 2012, as well as notes other significant paleomammalogy discoveries and events which occurred during that year.

Non-eutherian mammals

Eutherians

Research
 A phylogenetic analysis of living and fossil members of Carnivoramorpha is published by Michelle Spaulding and John J. Flynn (2012).
 A study of fossil giant deers is published by I. A. Vislobokova (2012).
 A study of the anatomy of skull and teeth of the proboscidean Eritherium azzouzorum is published by Emmanuel Gheerbrant, Baadi Bouya and Mbarek Amaghzaz (2012).

New taxa

References

2010s in paleontology
Paleontology
2012 in paleontology
Prehistoric mammals